Bananarama is the second studio album by British group Bananarama. Released in 1984, the album peaked at number 16 on the UK Albums Chart, reached the US top 40 albums chart, and was certified Silver by the BPI.

The group continued their association with producers Jolley & Swain (who had produced some tracks on their debut album, Deep Sea Skiving). With this album, Bananarama had their first significant U.S. success with the single "Cruel Summer". It became a top ten hit there (the song had also been a top 10 hit in the UK in 1983), bolstered by the song's inclusion in the soundtrack to the 1984 film The Karate Kid. Further hits from the album included "Robert De Niro's Waiting..." (UK No. 3) and "Rough Justice" (UK No. 23). The track "Hot Line to Heaven" was also released as a single in the UK but failed to reach the top 40, peaking at number 58. 

A music video was shot for "State I'm In", even though it wasn't released as a single from the album. The album includes a cover version of "Dream Baby" by Six Sed Red.

Details
The original vinyl release came in an embossed sleeve and included a poster which included song lyrics, a photo of each member of the group, and the message: "Well, a year is a long time, people change & maybe we have too – hopefully for the better! Anyway here are results of our hard work over the past twelve months. This is for you – we hope you like it. Best Wishes, love Keren X, All the best, love Sarah x, and  Lots of love, Siobhan xx".

The album and the song "King of the Jungle" were dedicated to the memory of their friend Thomas "Kidso" Reilly, who had recently been killed in Belfast.

Reception

At the time of release, Creem said the album had a "misty feeling that's almost nostalgic. Women don't sing like this anymore, with this kind of sighing regret. The album has curves, not edges, and it's got a texture you can float on, a shine like 'Don't Worry Baby' without the harmonic intricacy. With their waif-like, wafer-thin pipes, Keren, Siobhan and Sarah sound dazed, as though someone roused them from sleep and stuck them behind a mike."

Track listing
CD, LP and cassette versions

CD and LP US versions

2007 CD re-issue plus bonus tracks

2013 deluxe edition 2CD/DVD re-issue
Disc 1

Disc 2

DVD
"Cruel Summer" – directed by Brian Simmons
"Robert De Niro's Waiting..." – directed by Duncan Gibbins
"Rough Justice" – directed by Jonathan Gershfield
"Hot Line to Heaven" – directed by Jonathan Gershfield
"State I'm In" – directed by Jonathan Gershfield
"The Wild Life" 
"Cruel Summer 89" 
"Cruel Summer" – on Top of the Pops
"Robert De Niro's Waiting..." – on The Russell Harty Show
"Rough Justice" – on Top of the Pops"Michael Row the Boat Ashore" – on Saturday Superstore''

Some mid-80s US LP and CD versions
"Link" was not identified as an individual track on original LP issues, and an alternative version had originally appeared, also uncredited, preceding "Push!" on the B-side of the 12" of "Robert De Niro's Waiting...".

Personnel
Sara Dallin – vocals
Siobhan Fahey – vocals
Keren Woodward – vocals

Production
Tony Swain – producer, arranger, composer
Steve Jolley – producer, arranger, composer
Howie Weinberg at Masterdisk – mastering
Da Gama/Rama – art design
Peter Ashworth – photography

Charts

References

1984 albums
Bananarama albums
London Records albums
Albums produced by Jolley & Swain